Harrisonville is an unincorporated community in Meigs County, in the U.S. state of Ohio.

History
Harrisonville was founded in 1840, and named for William Henry Harrison, the winning candidate in the 1840 United States presidential election. A post office was established at Harrisonville in 1841, and remained in operation until 1964.

Popular Culture
Harrisonville is referenced in the Netflix series "The Haunting of Hill House", Season 1 Episode 9. The show referenced raining stones on the village in 1901.

References

Unincorporated communities in Meigs County, Ohio